The National Planning Authority of Uganda, commonly referred to as the National Planning Authority (NPA), is a semi-autonomous national development planning organisation in Uganda and is owned by the government of Uganda.

Location
The headquarters of NPA are located at Planning House, 15B Clement Hill Road, on Nakasero Hill, in Uganda's capital city of Kampala. The geographical coordinates of the Authority's headquarters are 0°19'12.0"N, 32°35'19.0"E (Latitude:0.320000; Longitude:32.588611).

Overview
The NPA was created by the Ugandan Parliament in 2002. The mission of the NPA is to produce comprehensive economic development plans for the country. NPA is also mandated to coordinate development planning in the entire country, and to advise the executive branch on the best policies and strategies for the development of the country. The agency is charged with the economic evaluation of public projects and programs, in collaboration with civil society and the private sector. It is also responsible for the development of local expertise in development planning nationally, and at district level.

One of the immediate planning goals is Uganda's attainment of middle-income status, with an annual per capita income of US$1,036 or higher. Originally planned for 2020, more realistic evaluation puts that event in the 2025 to 2030 time frame.

Governance
For a period of ten years, Dr Wilberforce Kisamba Mugerwa, an agricultural economist and former cabinet minister in the central government, served as the executive chairman of NPA. He resigned in August 2018. The executive director of the government agency, is Dr Joseph Muvawala.

In December 2020, a new board was appointed, with the following members, who will serve a five-year term; renewable once.

 Amanda Ngabirano: Chair
 Vincent Byendaimira: Member
 Jackie Kemigisha Kiiza: Member
 Edward Ssimbwa: Member
 Sarah Naigaga: Member 
 Denis Tugume: Member 
 Earnest Kimbugwe: Member
 Amina Achola: Member
 Florence Nambooze: Member

See also
 Economy of Uganda
 Direct investment
 Uganda Investment Authority

References

External links
National Development Authority Website

  

Organizations established in 2002
Kampala District
2002 establishments in Uganda